Umberto Nappello (born 9 March 1991) is an Italian footballer who plays as midfielder for Clodiense.

References

External links 

 

 

Living people
1991 births
Potenza Calcio players
Palermo F.C. players
A.C. Monza players
A.S. Gubbio 1910 players
Forlì F.C. players
A.S. Melfi players
U.S. Grosseto 1912 players
Savona F.B.C. players
A.S.D. Victor San Marino players
Clodiense S.S.D. players
AZ Picerno players
Serie C players
Serie D players
Italian footballers
Association football midfielders